Richard Ughtred Paul Kay-Shuttleworth, 2nd Baron Shuttleworth (30 October 1913 – 8 August 1940) was a British officer of the Royal Air Force, peer, and landowner, and a member of the House of Lords from 1937 until his death.

The elder son of Captain Lawrence Ughtred Kay-Shuttleworth, eldest son of Ughtred Kay-Shuttleworth, 1st Baron Shuttleworth, and his wife Selina Adine Bridgeman, he was educated at Eton College and Balliol College, Oxford, where he graduated BA.

Elected as a member of Lancashire County Council in 1937, Shuttleworth also became a Justice of the Peace for the county and was commissioned as a Flying Officer into the Royal Air Force Volunteer Reserve. On 20 December 1939, he succeeded his grandfather as the 2nd Baron Shuttleworth, of Gawthorpe (created 1902), and also to a baronetcy created in 1849, and inherited the Gawthorpe Hall estate at Ightenhill.

Shuttleworth fought in the Battle of Britain and in August 1940 was killed in action during air operations which formed part of it, when his Hawker Hurricane went missing during a battle over a convoy in the English Channel, south of the Isle of Wight.

Notes

The Few
People educated at Eton College
Alumni of Balliol College, Oxford
1913 births
1940 deaths